The John Crow Mountains are a range of mountains in Jamaica. They extend parallel with the northeast coast of the island, bounded to the west by the banks of the Rio Grande, and joining with the eastern end of the Blue Mountains in the southeast.

The name John Crow was first recorded in the 1820s  and comes from the Jamaican name for the turkey vulture. It has been suggested that previous to this, the range was known as the "Carrion Crow Ridge", after an earlier name for the vulture. In 1885 Inspector Herbert T. Thomas of the local constabulary began an attempt to reach the highest peak of the range, and in 1890 was successful, publishing an account in his book 'Untrodden Jamaica'. He requested the then governor Sir Henry Blake to consent that they be renamed the Blake Mountains, but admits in his book the change met with opposition. The new name did not stick and they remain the John Crow Mountains.

In 1920 the explorer Scoresby Routledge claimed to have been the first person to have crossed the John Crow mountains, leading to an exchange of letters in The Times regarding Inspector Thomas's prior claim. The matter was settled by the Jamaican Surveyor-General, who decided that though Thomas had been the first to scale the highest peak, and explore the ridge in a north-south direction, Mr. Routledge had traversed the valley and further range beyond: and thus he first "actually crossed them from west to east".

The John Crow Mountains are also home to the endangered Papilio homerus, the largest butterfly in the Americas. The most well-studied and understood populations of the dwindling species is found where the John Crow Mountains and Blue Mountains meet.

References

Mountain ranges of Jamaica
World Heritage Sites in Jamaica